Bob Bryan and Mike Bryan were the defending champions and they defend their 2009 title, after won 6–3, 7–5, against Stephen Huss and Wesley Moodie in the final.

Seeds

Draw

Draw

References
Main draw

Doubles